is a Czech masculine given name. The Polish alternative is Przemysł or Przemysław.

Famous bearers

Czech royals
 Přemysl the Ploughman – mythical founder of the Bohemian royal dynasty of Přemyslids
 Přemysl I Otakar – king of Bohemia (1198–1230)
 Přemysl II Otakar – king of Bohemia (1253–1278)
 Přemysl of Moravia 
 Přemysl I, Duke of Opava
 Přemysl II, Duke of Opava
 Přemysl III, Duke of Opava
 Rarely: any member of the Přemyslid dynasty (the form preferred in English is however "Přemyslid" in this case)

Others
 Přemysl Boublík, Czechoslovak actor
 Přemysl Coufal, Czech catholic priest
 Přemysl Kočí, Czech opera singer, director and manager
 Přemysl Matoušek, Czech actor
 Přemysl Pitter, Czech Protestant preacher
 Přemek Podlaha, Czech TV host
 Přemysl Pražský, Czech actor
 Přemysl Rabas, Czech politician
 Přemysl Rut, Czech dramatic, writer and musician
 Přemysl Šámal, Czech politician
 Přemysl Sobotka, Czech politician

See also
 Przemyśl, a city in Poland, sometimes referred to as Premysl in English-language documents from prior to World War II
 Slavic names

pl:Przemysław (imię)